Haloxylon persicum, the white saxaul, is a small tree belonging to the family Amaranthaceae. Its range is Western Asia, including the Palestine region, Egypt, Sinai, South Iraq, Saudi Arabia, Iran, Oman, UAE, Afghanistan, and Pakistan, to Central Asia (Kyrgyzstan, Turkmenistan, etc.), and  China (Xinjiang etc.).

Description
The Haloxylon persicum has a stout rugged stem and light grey bark, growing up to 4.5–5 metres in height. It lacks large foliage-type leaves; in fact, its leaves have retrogressed as succulent branches. The plant is found in sandhills, deserts and sand ridges, where it often forms pure stands, with an average density up to 400-500 trees a hectare. The white saxaul is a hardy tree that can grow in nutritionally poor soil and can tolerate drought. The tree is in leaf all year, and flowers in May–June.

Uses
The plant's extensive root system is useful for stabilising sandy soils. The wood is durable and heavy and is used in general carpentry. As it burns well and gives a good heat it is used as a fuel. It is called "ghada" in Arabic and was frequently mentioned in classical Arabic poetry.

Pests
Turcmenigena varentzovi (saxaul longhorn beetle, Varentsov's longhorn beetle) is a pest of the white saxaul tree in Kazakhstan, Turkmenistan, and Uzbekistan.

References

Amaranthaceae
Flora of Western Asia
Flora of Central Asia
Flora of Egypt
Trees of Western Asia
Flora of Kyrgyzstan
Flora of Kazakhstan
Flora of Turkmenistan
Flora of Uzbekistan
Flora of Afghanistan
Flora of Pakistan
Flora of Xinjiang
Flora of Saudi Arabia
Plants described in 1860
Taxa named by Alexander von Bunge